Eef van Breen (born 3 January 1978) is a Dutch jazz trumpeter, singer, arranger and composer.

Eef van Breen was born in Westerbork in the Dutch province of Drenthe.In 2010, van Breen wrote the music for ʼuʼ, the first opera in the Klingon language. His debut album Playing Games (2010, Challenge Jazz) obtained an Edison nomination.

Discography
Playing Games (Challenge, 2010)
Changing Scenes (Challenge, 2011)

References

External links 
 

1978 births
Living people
21st-century Dutch composers
21st-century Dutch male singers
21st-century Dutch singers
21st-century jazz composers
21st-century trumpeters
Dutch jazz composers
Dutch jazz singers
Dutch jazz trumpeters
Dutch music arrangers
Dutch opera composers
Jazz arrangers
Male jazz composers
Male opera composers
Musicians from Drenthe
People from Midden-Drenthe